Crime Stories is a British television crime drama series that aired on ITV from 12 November until 7 December 2012. Described as "groundbreaking" television, the series was one of a number of series developed by Paul Marquess which makes use of a documentary-style feel and unscripted dialogue. The series was panned by critics and viewers alike and was axed by ITV after just one series. The series made use of the set previously occupied by fellow ITV drama The Bill, for which Marquess served as executive producer from 2002–2005.

The series starred Jane Antrobus, a former real-life chief superintendent, and Ben Hull, as protagonists Jane Preston and Ben Shaw. Each episode features a select guest cast, made up of well-known actors including both soap and drama stars. Each episode follows the team as they investigate a given crime, including collecting CCTV, witness statements and interviewing suspects, all within the confines of the station. A total of 20 episodes were produced, airing daily at 2:00pm on ITV1. The series has never been released on DVD, although the show is regularly repeated on ITV Encore.

Cast
 Jane Antrobus as Detective Inspector Jane Preston — Preston is the senior investigator with East Central Police. She is very much a straightforward, blunt type of investigator, and is easily able to distinguish when a victim or suspect isn't telling the whole truth. Antrobus was formerly a real-life Superintendent, and retired shortly before filming on the series began.
 Ben Hull as Detective Sergeant Ben Shaw — Shaw is Preston's second in command, and takes a much more laid-back approach to investigating. He is the main collator, gathering evidence together such as CCTV footage, phone records and bank statements to gather a clear view of every suspect. Shaw is, however, a dog with bone and is determined to get to the truth, no matter what.
 Tom Butcher — Butcher is the narrator of every episode. He offers narration to scenes without dialogue and often bridges the gap between subsequent sections of each investigation in order to allow the story to flow without the need for explanation of every action. He also provides a closing statement which informs the viewer of the fate of every suspect.

Episodes

References

External links
 

2010s British crime drama television series
2012 British television series debuts
2012 British television series endings
British crime television series
ITV television dramas
Television series by ITV Studios
English-language television shows